The 1890 season saw Somerset County Cricket Club playing thirteen fixtures against other county teams.  These matches were not considered first-class, after Somerset had five years earlier been removed from the County Championship due to playing too few matches against other first-class counties.  In the summer of 1890, Somerset scheduled thirteen fixtures, winning twelve of them and tying one against Middlesex.  As a result of this, they were readmitted to the County Championship for the following 1891 season.

Squad
Players with international caps are listed in bold.

Matches

Batting averages

Notes

References

Bibliography

External links
 Cricket in England in 1890

1890 in English cricket
English cricket seasons in the 19th century
Somerset County Cricket Club seasons